Jacob LeFever (April 20, 1830 – February 4, 1905) was a U.S. Representative from New York.

Biography
Jacob LeFever was born in New Paltz, New York on April 20, 1830.  He was educated at New Paltz Academy and Amenia Seminary.  He operated a successful farm and became a prominent businessman and banker.  He was an officer of the Huguenot National Bank, a member of the board of directors of the New Paltz Savings Bank, and a member of the board of directors of the Wallkill Valley Railroad.

A Republican, LeFever served as Town Supervisor of New Paltz in 1861 and 1862, which also made him a member of the Ulster County Board of Supervisors.

He was a member of the New York State Assembly (Ulster Co., 2nd D.) in 1863, 1864, 1865 and 1867.

LeFever was a delegate to numerous Republican state conventions and was a delegate to the 1888 Republican National Convention.

He was not a candidate for renomination in 1896 to the Fifty-fifth Congress.

He served as president of the Huguenot National Bank from 1875 until his death.  He died in New Paltz on February 4, 1905, and was interred in New Paltz Rural Cemetery.

Jacob LeFever was the father of Frank Jacob Le Fevre, who also served in Congress.

Although he usually spelled his name as "LeFever", it appears variously in contemporary records and news accounts as "Le Fever", "Le Fevre", and "LeFevre."

References

Jacob LeFever in Life Sketches of the State Officers, Senators, and Members of the Assembly of the State of New York in 1867

1830 births
1905 deaths
Republican Party members of the United States House of Representatives from New York (state)
Republican Party members of the New York State Assembly
Town supervisors in New York (state)
American bank presidents
Burials in New York (state)
19th-century American politicians
19th-century American businesspeople